Hercegovačka Goleša is a village in municipality of Priboj, in south-west Serbia.Through Hercegovačka Goleša flows a small river, the Sutjeska. A road which connects Priboj to Pljevlja (Montenegro) over Sastavci, passes through the village.

At the exit of Sastavci the road branches, right side following a river Poblaćnica to the village of Krajčinovići, a well-known archaeological site from the prehistoric period. 

In 2002 the village had 430 inhabitants, four of them declared as Bosniaks. The population is constantly in decline. Nearby is an enclave of Bosnia and Herzegovina which totally enclosed in Serbian territory.

Gallery 

Populated places in Zlatibor District